This is a list of the bird species recorded in Paraguay. The avifauna of Paraguay has 694 confirmed species, of which two have been introduced by humans, 39 are rare or vagrants, and five are extirpated or extinct. An additional 27 species are hypothetical (see below). None are endemic.

Except as an entry is cited otherwise, the list of species is that of the South American Classification Committee (SACC) of the American Ornithological Society. The list's taxonomic treatment (designation and sequence of orders, families, and species) and nomenclature (common and scientific names) are also those of the SACC.

The following tags have been used to highlight certain categories of occurrence.

(V) Vagrant - a species that rarely or accidentally occurs in Paraguay
(E) Endemic - a species endemic to Paraguay
(I) Introduced - a species introduced to Paraguay as a consequence, direct or indirect, of human actions
(H) Hypothetical - a species recorded but with "no tangible evidence" according to the SACC

Rheas
Order: RheiformesFamily: Rheidae

The rheas are large flightless birds native to South America. Their feet have three toes rather than four which allows them to run faster. One species has been recorded in Paraguay.

Greater rhea, Rhea americana

Tinamous
Order: TinamiformesFamily: Tinamidae

The tinamous are among the most ancient groups of birds. Although they look similar to other ground-dwelling birds like quail and grouse, they have no close relatives and are classified as a single family, Tinamidae, within their own order, the Tinamiformes. They are distantly related to the ratites (order Struthioniformes) that includes the rheas, emus, and kiwis. Twelve species have been recorded in Paraguay.

Solitary tinamou, Tinamus solitarius
Brown tinamou, Crypturellus obsoletus
Undulated tinamou, Crypturellus undulatus
Small-billed tinamou, Crypturellus parvirostris
Tataupa tinamou, Crypturellus tataupa
Red-winged tinamou, Rhynchotus rufescens
Brushland tinamou, Nothoprocta cinerascens
White-bellied nothura, Nothura boraquira
Lesser nothura, Nothura minor
Spotted nothura, Nothura maculosa
Dwarf tinamou, Taoniscus nanus (H)
Quebracho crested-tinamou, Eudromia formosa

Screamers
Order: AnseriformesFamily: Anhimidae

The screamers are a small family of birds related to the ducks. They are large, bulky birds, with a small downy head, long legs and large feet which are only partially webbed. They have large spurs on their wings which are used in fights over mates and in territorial disputes. Two species have been recorded in Paraguay.

Horned screamer, Anhima cornuta
Southern screamer, Chauna torquata

Ducks
Order: AnseriformesFamily: Anatidae

Anatidae includes the ducks and most duck-like waterfowl, such as geese and swans. These birds are adapted to an aquatic existence with webbed feet, flattened bills, and feathers that are excellent at shedding water due to an oily coating. Twenty-two species have been recorded in Paraguay.

Fulvous whistling-duck, Dendrocygna bicolor
White-faced whistling-duck, Dendrocygna viduata
Black-bellied whistling-duck, Dendrocygna autumnalis
Coscoroba swan, Coscoroba coscoroba
Orinoco goose, Oressochen jubata (V)
Muscovy duck, Cairina moschata
Comb duck, Sarkidiornis sylvicola
Ringed teal, Callonetta leucophrys
Brazilian teal, Amazonetta brasiliensis
Silver teal, Spatula versicolor
Red shoveler, Spatula platalea
Blue-winged teal, Spatula discors (H)
Cinnamon teal, Spatula cyanoptera
White-cheeked pintail, Anas bahamensis
Yellow-billed pintail, Anas georgica (V)
Yellow-billed teal, Anas flavirostris (V)
Southern pochard, Netta erythrophthalma (H)
Rosy-billed pochard, Netta peposaca
Brazilian merganser, Mergus octosetaceus (extirpated)
Black-headed duck, Heteronetta atricapilla
Masked duck, Nomonyx dominicus
Lake duck, Oxyura vittata (V)

Guans
Order: GalliformesFamily: Cracidae

The Cracidae are large birds, similar in general appearance to turkeys. The guans and curassows live in trees, but the smaller chachalacas are found in more open scrubby habitats. They are generally dull-plumaged, but the curassows and some guans have colorful facial ornaments. Six species have been recorded in Paraguay.

Rusty-margined guan, Penelope superciliaris
Dusky-legged guan, Penelope obscura (H)
Blue-throated piping-guan, Pipile cumanensis
Black-fronted piping-guan, Pipile jacutinga
Chaco chachalaca, Ortalis canicollis
Bare-faced curassow, Crax fasciolata

New World quails
Order: GalliformesFamily: Odontophoridae

The New World quails are small, plump terrestrial birds only distantly related to the quails of the Old World, but named for their similar appearance and habits. One species has been recorded in Paraguay.

Spot-winged wood-quail, Odontophorus capueira

Flamingos
Order: PhoenicopteriformesFamily: Phoenicopteridae

Flamingos filter-feed on shellfish and algae. Their oddly shaped beaks are specially adapted to separate mud and silt from the food they consume and, uniquely, are used upside-down. One species has been recorded in Paraguay.

Chilean flamingo, Phoenicopterus chilensis

Grebes
Order: PodicipediformesFamily: Podicipedidae

Grebes are small to medium-large freshwater diving birds. They have lobed toes and are excellent swimmers and divers. However, they have their feet placed far back on the body, making them quite ungainly on land. Five species have been recorded in Paraguay.

White-tufted grebe, Rollandia rolland
Least grebe, Tachybaptus dominicus
Pied-billed grebe, Podilymbus podiceps
Great grebe, Podiceps major (V)
Silvery grebe, Podiceps occipitalis

Pigeons
Order: ColumbiformesFamily: Columbidae

Pigeons and doves are stout-bodied birds with short necks and short slender bills with a fleshy cere. Sixteen species have been recorded in Paraguay.

Rock pigeon, Columba livia (I)
Scaled pigeon, Patagioenas speciosa
Picazuro pigeon, Patagioenas picazuro
Spot-winged pigeon, Patagioenas maculosa
Pale-vented pigeon, Patagioenas cayennensis
Ruddy quail-dove, Geotrygon montana
Violaceous quail-dove, Geotrygon violacea
White-tipped dove, Leptotila verreauxi
Gray-fronted dove, Leptotila rufaxilla
Eared dove, Zenaida auriculata
Blue ground dove, Claravis pretiosa
Purple-winged ground dove, Paraclaravis geoffroyi
Plain-breasted ground dove, Columbina minuta
Ruddy ground dove, Columbina talpacoti
Scaled dove, Columbina squammata
Picui ground dove, Columbina picui

Cuckoos
Order: CuculiformesFamily: Cuculidae

The family Cuculidae includes cuckoos, roadrunners, and anis. These birds are of variable size with slender bodies, long tails, and strong legs. Thirteen species have been recorded in Paraguay.

Guira cuckoo, Guira guira
Greater ani, Crotophaga major
Smooth-billed ani, Crotophaga ani
Striped cuckoo, Tapera naevia
Pheasant cuckoo, Dromococcyx phasianellus
Pavonine cuckoo, Dromococcyx pavoninus
Little cuckoo, Coccycua minuta (H)
Ash-colored cuckoo, Coccycua cinerea
Squirrel cuckoo, Piaya cayana
Dark-billed cuckoo, Coccyzus melacoryphus
Yellow-billed cuckoo, Coccyzus americanus
Pearly-breasted cuckoo, Coccyzus euleri
Black-billed cuckoo, Coccyzus erythropthalmus (V)

Potoos
Order: NyctibiiformesFamily: Nyctibiidae

The potoos (sometimes called poor-me-ones) are large near passerine birds related to the nightjars and frogmouths. They are nocturnal insectivores which lack the bristles around the mouth found in the true nightjars. There are seven species, of which three have been recorded in Paraguay.

Great potoo, Nyctibius grandis
Long-tailed potoo, Nyctibius aethereus
Common potoo, Nyctibius griseus

Nightjars
Order: CaprimulgiformesFamily: Caprimulgidae

Nightjars are medium-sized nocturnal birds that usually nest on the ground. They have long wings, short legs, and very short bills. Most have small feet, of little use for walking, and long pointed wings. Their soft plumage is camouflaged to resemble bark or leaves. Sixteen species have been recorded in Paraguay.

Nacunda nighthawk, Chordeiles nacunda
Lesser nighthawk, Chordeiles acutipennis (H)
Common nighthawk, Chordeiles minor
Short-tailed nighthawk, Lurocalis semitorquatus
Band-tailed nighthawk, Nyctiprogne leucopyga
Band-winged nightjar, Systellura longirostris
Common pauraque, Nyctidromus albicollis
White-winged nightjar, Eleothreptus candicans
Sickle-winged nightjar, Eleothreptus anomalus
Little nightjar, Setopagis parvula
Spot-tailed nightjar, Hydropsalis maculicaudus
Scissor-tailed nightjar, Hydropsalis torquata
Long-trained nightjar, Macropsalis forcipata (V)
Ocellated poorwill, Nyctiphrynus ocellatus
Silky-tailed nightjar, Antrostomus sericocaudatus
Rufous nightjar, Antrostomus rufus

Swifts
Order: ApodiformesFamily: Apodidae

Swifts are small birds which spend the majority of their lives flying. These birds have very short legs and never settle voluntarily on the ground, perching instead only on vertical surfaces. Many swifts have long swept-back wings which resemble a crescent or boomerang. Six species have been recorded in Paraguay.

Sooty swift, Cypseloides fumigatus
Great dusky swift, Cypseloides senex
White-collared swift, Streptoprocne zonaris
Biscutate swift, Streptoprocne biscutata (H)
Gray-rumped swift, Chaetura cinereiventris
Sick's swift, Chaetura meridionalis

Hummingbirds
Order: ApodiformesFamily: Trochilidae

Hummingbirds are small birds capable of hovering in mid-air due to the rapid flapping of their wings. They are the only birds that can fly backwards. Twenty species have been recorded in Paraguay.

Black jacobin, Florisuga fusca
Buff-bellied hermit, Phaethornis subochraceus (V)
Planalto hermit, Phaethornis pretrei
Scale-throated hermit, Phaethornis eurynome
White-vented violetear, Colibri serrirostris
White-tailed goldenthroat, Polytmus guainumbi
Ruby-topaz hummingbird, Chrysolampis mosquitus (H)
Black-throated mango, Anthracothorax nigricollis
Long-billed starthroat, Heliomaster longirostris (H)
Blue-tufted starthroat, Heliomaster furcifer
Amethyst woodstar, Calliphlox amethystina
Glittering-bellied emerald, Chlorostilbon lucidus
Purple-crowned plovercrest, Stephanoxis loddigesii
Swallow-tailed hummingbird, Eupetomena macroura
Fork-tailed woodnymph, Thalurania furcata
Violet-capped woodnymph, Thalurania glaucopis
Versicolored emerald, Chrysuronia versicolor
White-throated hummingbird, Leucochloris albicollis
Rufous-throated sapphire, Hylocharis sapphirina (H)
Gilded hummingbird, Hylocharis chrysura

Limpkin
Order: GruiformesFamily: Aramidae

The limpkin resembles a large rail. It has drab-brown plumage and a grayer head and neck.

Limpkin, Aramus guarauna

Rails
Order: GruiformesFamily: Rallidae

Rallidae is a large family of small to medium-sized birds which includes the rails, crakes, coots and gallinules. Typically they inhabit dense vegetation in damp environments near lakes, swamps, or rivers. In general they are shy and secretive birds, making them difficult to observe. Most species have strong legs and long toes which are well adapted to soft uneven surfaces. They tend to have short, rounded wings and to be weak fliers. Twenty-three species have been recorded in Paraguay.

Purple gallinule, Porphyrio martinica
Azure gallinule, Porphyrio flavirostris
Russet-crowned crake, Anurolimnas viridis
Rufous-sided crake, Laterallus melanophaius
Gray-breasted crake, Laterallus exilis
Red-and-white crake, Laterallus leucopyrrhus
Rufous-faced crake, Laterallus xenopterus
Speckled rail, Coturnicops notatus
Ocellated crake, Micropygia schomburgkii
Ash-throated crake, Mustelirallus albicollis
Paint-billed crake, Mustelirallus erythrops
Spotted rail, Pardirallus maculatus
Blackish rail, Pardirallus nigricans
Plumbeous rail, Pardirallus sanguinolentus
Giant wood-rail, Aramides ypecaha
Gray-cowled wood-rail, Aramides cajaneus
Slaty-breasted wood rail, Aramides saracura
Spot-flanked gallinule, Porphyriops melanops
Yellow-breasted crake, Hapalocrex flaviventer
Common gallinule, Gallinula galeata
Red-fronted coot, Fulica rufifrons (V)
Red-gartered coot, Fulica armillata
White-winged coot, Fulica leucoptera

Finfoots
Order: GruiformesFamily: Heliornithidae

Heliornithidae is a small family of tropical birds with webbed lobes on their feet similar to those of grebes and coots. One species has been recorded in Paraguay.

Sungrebe, Heliornis fulica

Plovers
Order: CharadriiformesFamily: Charadriidae

The family Charadriidae includes the plovers, dotterels and lapwings. They are small to medium-sized birds with compact bodies, short, thick necks, and long, usually pointed, wings. They are found in open country worldwide, mostly in habitats near water. Seven species which have been recorded in Paraguay.

American golden-plover, Pluvialis dominica
Black-bellied plover, Pluvialis squatarola
Pied lapwing, Vanellus cayanus
Southern lapwing, Vanellus chilensis
Rufous-chested dotterel, Charadrius modestus (V)
Semipalmated plover, Charadrius semipalmatus (V)
Collared plover, Charadrius collaris

Avocets and stilts
Order: CharadriiformesFamily: Recurvirostridae

Recurvirostridae is a family of large wading birds, which includes the avocets and stilts. The avocets have long legs and long up-curved bills. The stilts have extremely long legs and long, thin, straight bills. One species has been recorded in Paraguay.

Black-necked stilt, Himantopus melanurus

Sandpipers
Order: CharadriiformesFamily: Scolopacidae

Scolopacidae is a large diverse family of small to medium-sized shorebirds including the sandpipers, curlews, godwits, shanks, tattlers, woodcocks, snipes, dowitchers, and phalaropes. The majority of these species eat small invertebrates picked out of the mud or soil. Variation in length of legs and bills enables multiple species to feed in the same habitat, particularly on the coast, without direct competition for food. Twenty-three species have been recorded in Paraguay.

Upland sandpiper, Bartramia longicauda
Eskimo curlew, Numenius borealis (believed extinct)
Hudsonian godwit, Limosa haemastica
Ruddy turnstone, Arenaria interpres (V)
Red knot, Calidris canutus
Stilt sandpiper, Calidris himantopus
Sanderling, Calidris alba
Dunlin, Calidris alpina (V)
Baird's sandpiper, Calidris bairdii
Least sandpiper, Calidris minutilla (V)
White-rumped sandpiper, Calidris fuscicollis
Buff-breasted sandpiper, Calidris subruficollis
Pectoral sandpiper, Calidris melanotos
Semipalmated sandpiper, Calidris pusilla (H)
Short-billed dowitcher, Limnodromus griseus (H)
Giant snipe, Gallinago undulata
Pantanal snipe, Gallinago paraguaiae
Wilson's phalarope, Phalaropus tricolor
Red phalarope, Phalaropus fulicarius (V)
Spotted sandpiper, Actitis macularia
Solitary sandpiper, Tringa solitaria
Greater yellowlegs, Tringa melanoleuca
Lesser yellowlegs, Tringa flavipes

Jacanas
Order: CharadriiformesFamily: Jacanidae

The jacanas are a group of waders which are found throughout the tropics. They are identifiable by their huge feet and claws which enable them to walk on floating vegetation in the shallow lakes that are their preferred habitat. One species has been recorded in Paraguay.

Wattled jacana, Jacana jacana

Painted-snipes
Order: CharadriiformesFamily: Rostratulidae

Painted-snipes are short-legged, long-billed birds similar in shape to the true snipes, but more brightly colored. One species has been recorded in Paraguay.

South American painted-snipe, Rostratula semicollaris

Skimmers
Order: CharadriiformesFamily: Rynchopidae

Skimmers are a small family of tropical tern-like birds. They have an elongated lower mandible which they use to feed by flying low over the water surface and skimming the water for small fish. One species has been recorded in Paraguay.

Black skimmer, Rynchops niger

Gulls
Order: CharadriiformesFamily: Laridae

Laridae is a family of medium to large seabirds and includes gulls, kittiwakes, terns, and skimmers. Gulls are typically gray or white, often with black markings on the head or wings. They have longish bills and webbed feet. Terns are a group of generally medium to large seabirds typically with gray or white plumage, often with black markings on the head. Most terns hunt fish by diving but some pick insects off the surface of fresh water. Terns are generally long-lived birds, with several species known to live in excess of 30 years. Twelve species of Laridae have been recorded in Paraguay.

Brown-hooded gull, Chroicocephalus maculipennis (V)
Gray-hooded gull, Chroicocephalus cirrocephalus
Laughing Gull, Leucophaeus atricilla (V)
Franklin's Gull, Leucophaeus pipixcan (V)
Yellow-billed tern, Sternula superciliaris
Large-billed tern, Phaetusa simplex
Gull-billed Tern, Gelochelidon nilotica (V)
Whiskered tern, Chlidonias hybrida (V)
Common Tern, Sterna hirundo (V)
Arctic tern, Sterna paradisaea (V)
Snowy-crowned Tern, Sterna trudeaui (H)
Royal Tern, Thalasseus maximus (H)

Storks
Order: CiconiiformesFamily: Ciconiidae

Storks are large, long-legged, long-necked, wading birds with long, stout bills. Storks are mute, but bill-clattering is an important mode of communication at the nest. Their nests can be large and may be reused for many years. Many species are migratory. Three species have been recorded in Paraguay.

Maguari stork, Ciconia maguari
Jabiru, Jabiru mycteria
Wood stork, Mycteria americana

Anhingas
Order: SuliformesFamily: Anhingidae

Anhingas are often called "snake-birds" because of their long thin neck, which gives a snake-like appearance when they swim with their bodies submerged. The males have black and dark-brown plumage, an erectile crest on the nape, and a larger bill than the female. The females have much paler plumage especially on the neck and underparts. The darters have completely webbed feet and their legs are short and set far back on the body. Their plumage is somewhat permeable, like that of cormorants, and they spread their wings to dry after diving. One species has been recorded in Paraguay.

Anhinga, Anhinga anhinga

Cormorants
Order: SuliformesFamily: Phalacrocoracidae

Phalacrocoracidae is a family of medium to large coastal, fish-eating seabirds that includes cormorants and shags. Plumage colouration varies, with the majority having mainly dark plumage, some species being black-and-white and a few being colorful. One species has been recorded in Paraguay.

Neotropic cormorant, Phalacrocorax brasilianus

Herons
Order: PelecaniformesFamily: Ardeidae

The family Ardeidae contains the bitterns, herons and egrets. Herons and egrets are medium to large wading birds with long necks and legs. Bitterns tend to be shorter necked and more wary. Members of Ardeidae fly with their necks retracted, unlike other long-necked birds such as storks, ibises and spoonbills. Fourteen species have been recorded in Paraguay.

Rufescent tiger-heron, Tigrisoma lineatum
Boat-billed heron, Cochlearius cochlearius
Pinnated bittern, Botaurus pinnatus
Least bittern, Ixobrychus exilis
Stripe-backed bittern, Ixobrychus involucris
Black-crowned night-heron, Nycticorax nycticorax
Striated heron, Butorides striata
Cattle egret, Bubulcus ibis
Cocoi heron, Ardea cocoi
Great egret, Ardea alba
Whistling heron, Syrigma sibilatrix
Capped heron, Pilherodius pileatus
Snowy egret, Egretta thula
Little blue heron, Egretta caerulea (V)

Ibises
Order: PelecaniformesFamily: Threskiornithidae

Threskiornithidae is a family of large terrestrial and wading birds which includes the ibises and spoonbills. They have long, broad wings with 11 primary and about 20 secondary feathers. They are strong fliers and despite their size and weight, very capable soarers. Six species have been recorded in Paraguay.

White-faced ibis, Plegadis chihi
Green ibis, Mesembrinibis cayennensis
Bare-faced ibis, Phimosus infuscatus
Plumbeous ibis, Theristicus caerulescens
Buff-necked ibis, Theristicus caudatus
Roseate spoonbill, Platalea ajaja

New World vultures
Order: CathartiformesFamily: Cathartidae

The New World vultures are not closely related to Old World vultures, but superficially resemble them because of convergent evolution. Like the Old World vultures, they are scavengers. However, unlike Old World vultures, which find carcasses by sight, New World vultures have a good sense of smell with which they locate carrion. Five species have been recorded in Paraguay.

King vulture, Sarcoramphus papa
Andean condor, Vultur gryphus (H)
Black vulture, Coragyps atratus
Turkey vulture, Cathartes aura
Lesser yellow-headed vulture, Cathartes burrovianus

Osprey
Order: AccipitriformesFamily: Pandionidae

The family Pandionidae contains only one species, the osprey. The osprey is a medium-large raptor which is a specialist fish-eater with a worldwide distribution.

Osprey, Pandion haliaetus

Hawks
Order: AccipitriformesFamily: Accipitridae

Accipitriformes is an order of birds of prey, which includes hawks, eagles, kites, harriers (all Accipitridae), the osprey (Pandionidae), and New World vultures (Cathartidae). These birds have powerful hooked beaks for tearing flesh from their prey, strong legs, powerful talons, and keen eyesight. Thirty-five species of Accipitridae have been recorded in Paraguay.

Pearl kite, Gampsonyx swainsonii
White-tailed kite, Elanus leucurus
Hook-billed kite, Chondrohierax uncinatus
Gray-headed kite, Leptodon cayanensis
Swallow-tailed kite, Elanoides forficatus
Crested eagle, Morphnus guianensis
Harpy eagle, Harpia harpyja
Black hawk-eagle, Spizaetus tyrannus
Black-and-white hawk-eagle, Spizaetus melanoleucus
Ornate hawk-eagle, Spizaetus ornatus
Black-collared hawk, Busarellus nigricollis
Snail kite, Rostrhamus sociabilis
Rufous-thighed kite, Harpagus diodon
Mississippi kite, Ictinia mississippiensis
Plumbeous kite, Ictinia plumbea
Cinereous harrier, Circus cinereus
Long-winged harrier, Circus buffoni
Gray-bellied hawk, Accipiter poliogaster
Sharp-shinned hawk, Accipiter striatus
Bicolored hawk, Accipiter bicolor
Tiny hawk, Microspizias superciliosus
Crane hawk, Geranospiza caerulescens
Savanna hawk, Buteogallus meridionalis
Great black hawk, Buteogallus urubitinga
Chaco eagle, Buteogallus coronatus
Roadside hawk, Rupornis magnirostris
Harris's hawk, Parabuteo unicinctus
White-rumped hawk, Parabuteo leucorrhous
White-tailed hawk, Geranoaetus albicaudatus
Black-chested buzzard-eagle, Geranoaetus melanoleucus
Mantled hawk, Pseudastur polionotus (extirpated)
Gray-lined hawk, Buteo nitidus
Short-tailed hawk, Buteo brachyurus
Swainson's hawk, Buteo swainsoni
Zone-tailed hawk, Buteo albonotatus

Barn owls
Order: StrigiformesFamily: Tytonidae

Barn owls are medium to large owls with large heads and characteristic heart-shaped faces. They have long strong legs with powerful talons. One species has been recorded in Paraguay.

Barn owl, Tyto alba

Owls
Order: StrigiformesFamily: Strigidae

The typical owls are small to large solitary nocturnal birds of prey. They have large forward-facing eyes and ears, a hawk-like beak, and a conspicuous circle of feathers around each eye called a facial disk. Sixteen species have been recorded in Paraguay.

Tropical screech-owl, Megascops choliba
Black-capped screech-owl, Megascops atricapilla
Spectacled owl, Pulsatrix perspicillata
Tawny-browed owl, Pulsatrix koeniswaldiana
Great horned owl, Bubo virginianus
Rusty-barred owl, Strix hylophila
Chaco owl, Strix chacoensis
Mottled owl, Strix virgata
Black-banded owl, Strix huhula
Least pygmy-owl, Glaucidium minutissimum (H)
Ferruginous pygmy-owl, Glaucidium brasilianum
Burrowing owl, Athene cunicularia
Buff-fronted owl, Aegolius harrisii
Striped owl, Asio clamator
Stygian owl, Asio stygius
Short-eared owl, Asio flammeus

Trogons
Order: TrogoniformesFamily: Trogonidae

The family Trogonidae includes trogons and quetzals. Found in tropical woodlands worldwide, they feed on insects and fruit, and their broad bills and weak legs reflect their diet and arboreal habits. Although their flight is fast, they are reluctant to fly any distance. Trogons have soft, often colorful, feathers with distinctive male and female plumage. Three species have been recorded in Paraguay.

Blue-crowned trogon, Trogon curucui
Surucua trogon, Trogon surrucura
Black-throated trogon, Trogon rufus (see note)

Motmots
Order: CoraciiformesFamily: Momotidae

The motmots have colorful plumage and long, graduated tails which they display by waggling back and forth. In most of the species, the barbs near the ends of the two longest (central) tail feathers are weak and fall off, leaving a length of bare shaft and creating a racket-shaped tail. Two species have been recorded in Paraguay.

Rufous-capped motmot, Baryphthengus ruficapillus
Amazonian motmot, Momotus momota

Kingfishers
Order: CoraciiformesFamily: Alcedinidae

Kingfishers are medium-sized birds with large heads, long, pointed bills, short legs, and stubby tails. Five species have been recorded in Paraguay.

Ringed kingfisher, Megaceryle torquata
Amazon kingfisher, Chloroceryle amazona
American pygmy kingfisher, Chloroceryle aenea
Green kingfisher, Chloroceryle americana
Green-and-rufous kingfisher, Chloroceryle inda

Jacamars
Order: GalbuliformesFamily: Galbulidae

The jacamars are near passerine birds from tropical South America, with a range that extends up to Mexico. They feed on insects caught on the wing, and are glossy, elegant birds with long bills and tails. In appearance and behavior they resemble the Old World bee-eaters, although they are more closely related to puffbirds. One species has been recorded in Paraguay.

Rufous-tailed jacamar, Galbula ruficauda

Puffbirds
Order: GalbuliformesFamily: Bucconidae

The puffbirds are related to the jacamars and have the same range, but lack the iridescent colors of that family. They are mainly brown, rufous, or gray, with large heads and flattened bills with hooked tips. The loose abundant plumage and short tails makes them look stout and puffy, giving rise to the English common name of the family. Four species have been recorded in Paraguay.

Buff-bellied puffbird, Notharchus swainsoni
White-eared puffbird, Nystalus chacuru
Spot-backed puffbird, Nystalus maculatus
Rusty-breasted nunlet, Nonnula rubecula

Toucans
Order: PiciformesFamily: Ramphastidae

Toucans are near passerine birds from the Neotropics. They are brightly marked and have enormous colorful bills which in some species amount to half their body length. Five species have been recorded in Paraguay.

Toco toucan, Ramphastos toco
Red-breasted toucan, Ramphastos dicolorus
Spot-billed toucanet, Selenidera maculirostris
Saffron toucanet, Baillonius bailloni
Chestnut-eared aracari, Pteroglossus castanotis

Woodpeckers
Order: PiciformesFamily: Picidae

Woodpeckers are small to medium-sized birds with chisel-like beaks, short legs, stiff tails, and long tongues used for capturing insects. Some species have feet with two toes pointing forward and two backward, while several species have only three toes. Many woodpeckers have the habit of tapping noisily on tree trunks with their beaks. Twenty-one species have been recorded in Paraguay.

White-barred piculet, Picumnus cirratus
Ochre-collared piculet, Picumnus temminckii
White-wedged piculet, Picumnus albosquamatus
White woodpecker, Melanerpes candidus
Yellow-fronted woodpecker, Melanerpes flavifrons
White-fronted woodpecker, Melanerpes cactorum
White-spotted woodpecker, Dryobates spilogaster
Checkered woodpecker, Dryobates mixtus
Little woodpecker, Dryobates passerinus
Robust woodpecker, Campephilus robustus
Crimson-crested woodpecker, Campephilus melanoleucos
Cream-backed woodpecker, Campephilus leucopogon
Lineated woodpecker, Dryocopus lineatus
Black-bodied woodpecker, Dryocopus schulzi
Pale-crested woodpecker, Celeus lugubris
Helmeted woodpecker, Celeus galeatus
Blond-crested woodpecker, Celeus flavescens
Golden-green woodpecker, Piculus chrysochloros
White-browed woodpecker, Piculus aurulentus
Green-barred woodpecker, Colaptes melanochloros
Campo flicker, Colaptes campestris

Seriemas
Order: CariamiformesFamily: Cariamidae

The seriemas are terrestrial birds which run rather than fly (though they are able to fly for short distances). They have long legs, necks and tails, but only short wings, reflecting their way of life. They are brownish birds with short bills and erectile crests, found on fairly-dry open grasslands. Both of the family's two species have been recorded in Paraguay.

Red-legged seriema, Cariama cristata
Black-legged seriema, Chunga burmeisteri

Falcons
Order: FalconiformesFamily: Falconidae

Falconidae is a family of diurnal birds of prey. They differ from hawks, eagles and kites in that they kill with their beaks instead of their talons. Twelve species have been recorded in Paraguay.

Laughing falcon, Herpetotheres cachinnans
Barred forest-falcon, Micrastur ruficollis
Collared forest-falcon, Micrastur semitorquatus
Spot-winged falconet, Spiziapteryx circumcincta
Crested caracara, Caracara plancus
Yellow-headed caracara, Milvago chimachima
Chimango caracara, Milvago chimango
American kestrel, Falco sparverius
Bat falcon, Falco rufigularis
Orange-breasted falcon, Falco deiroleucus
Aplomado falcon, Falco femoralis
Peregrine falcon, Falco peregrinus

New World and African parrots
Order: PsittaciformesFamily: Psittacidae

Parrots are small to large birds with a characteristic curved beak. Their upper mandibles have slight mobility in the joint with the skull and they have a generally erect stance. All parrots are zygodactyl, having the four toes on each foot placed two at the front and two to the back. Twenty-four species have been recorded in Paraguay.

Monk parakeet, Myiopsitta monachus
Yellow-chevroned parakeet, Brotogeris chiriri
Pileated parrot, Pionopsitta pileata
Scaly-headed parrot, Pionus maximiliani
Yellow-faced parrot, Alipiopsitta xanthops
Vinaceous-breasted parrot, Amazona vinacea
Red-spectacled parrot, Amazona pretrei (H)
Turquoise-fronted parrot, Amazona aestiva
Orange-winged parrot, Amazona amazonica
Cobalt-rumped parrotlet, Forpus xanthopterygius
Blaze-winged parakeet, Pyrrhura devillei
Maroon-bellied parakeet, Pyrrhura frontalis
Green-cheeked parakeet, Pyrrhura molinae
Hyacinth macaw, Anodorhynchus hyacinthinus
Glaucous macaw, Anodorhynchus glaucus (possibly extinct)
Peach-fronted parakeet, Eupsittula aurea
Nanday parakeet, Aratinga nenday
Golden-capped parakeet, Aratinga auricapillus (V)
Blue-winged macaw, Primolius maracana
Yellow-collared macaw, Primolius auricollis
Blue-and-yellow macaw, Ara ararauna
Red-and-green macaw, Ara chloropterus
Blue-crowned parakeet, Thectocercus acuticaudatus
White-eyed parakeet, Psittacara leucophthalmus

Antbirds
Order: PasseriformesFamily: Thamnophilidae

The antbirds are a large family of small passerine birds of subtropical and tropical Central and South America. They are forest birds which tend to feed on insects at or near the ground. A sizable minority of them specialize in following columns of army ants to eat small invertebrates that leave their hiding places to flee from the ants. Many species lack bright color; brown, black and white being the dominant tones. Twenty-two species have been recorded in Paraguay.

Spot-backed antshrike, Hypoedaleus guttatus
Giant antshrike, Batara cinerea
Large-tailed antshrike, Mackenziaena leachii
Tufted antshrike, Mackenziaena severa
Great antshrike, Taraba major
Barred antshrike, Thamnophilus doliatus
Rufous-capped antshrike, Thamnophilus ruficapillus
Rufous-winged antshrike, Thamnophilus torquatus
Bolivian slaty-antshrike, Thamnophilus sticturus
Variable antshrike, Thamnophilus caerulescens
Plain antvireo, Dysithamnus mentalis
Black-capped antwren, Herpsilochmus atricapillus
Rusty-winged antwren, Herpsilochmus rufimarginatus
Stripe-backed antbird, Myrmorchilus strigilatus
Black-bellied antwren, Formicivora melanogaster
Rusty-backed antwren, Formicivora rufa
Bertoni's antbird, Drymophila rubricollis
Dusky-tailed antbird, Drymophila malura
Streak-capped antwren, Terenura maculata
Mato Grosso antbird, Cercomacra melanaria
Western fire-eye, Pyriglena maura
White-shouldered fire-eye, Pyriglena leucoptera

Crescentchests
Order: PasseriformesFamily: Melanopareiidae

These are smallish birds which inhabit regions of arid scrub. They have a band across the chest which gives them their name.

Collared crescentchest, Melanopareia torquata
Olive-crowned crescentchest, Melanopareia maximiliani

Gnateaters
Order: PasseriformesFamily: Conopophagidae

The gnateaters are round, short-tailed and long-legged birds, which are closely related to the antbirds. One species has been recorded in Paraguay.

Rufous gnateater, Conopophaga lineata

Antpittas
Order: PasseriformesFamily: Grallariidae

Antpittas resemble the true pittas with strong, longish legs, very short tails and stout bills. Two species have been recorded in Paraguay

Variegated antpitta, Grallaria varia
Speckle-breasted antpitta, Cryptopezus nattereri

Tapaculos
Order: PasseriformesFamily: Rhinocryptidae

The tapaculos are small suboscine passeriform birds with numerous species in South and Central America. They are terrestrial species that fly only poorly on their short wings. They have strong legs, well-suited to their habitat of grassland or forest undergrowth. The tail is cocked and pointed towards the head.

Crested gallito, Rhinocrypta lanceolata

Antthrushes
Order: PasseriformesFamily: Formicariidae

Antthrushes resemble small rails. One species has been recorded in Paraguay.

Short-tailed antthrush, Chamaeza campanisona

Ovenbirds
Order: PasseriformesFamily: Furnariidae

Ovenbirds comprise a large family of small sub-oscine passerine bird species found in Central and South America. They are a diverse group of insectivores which gets its name from the elaborate "oven-like" clay nests built by some species, although others build stick nests or nest in tunnels or clefts in rock. The woodcreepers are brownish birds which maintain an upright vertical posture, supported by their stiff tail vanes. They feed mainly on insects taken from tree trunks. Fifty-eight species have been recorded in Paraguay.

Rufous-breasted leaftosser, Sclerurus scansor
Campo miner, Geositta poeciloptera (V)
Olivaceous woodcreeper, Sittasomus griseicapillus
Plain-winged woodcreeper, Dendrocincla turdina
Black-banded woodcreeper, Dendrocolaptes picumnus
Planalto woodcreeper, Dendrocolaptes platyrostris
White-throated woodcreeper, Xiphocolaptes albicollis
Great rufous woodcreeper, Xiphocolaptes major
Lesser woodcreeper, Xiphorhynchus fuscus 
Red-billed scythebill, Campylorhamphus trochilirostris
Black-billed scythebill, Campylorhamphus falcularius
Scimitar-billed woodcreeper, Drymornis bridgesii
Narrow-billed woodcreeper, Lepidocolaptes angustirostris
Scalloped woodcreeper, Lepidocolaptes falcinellus
Plain xenops, Xenops minutus
Streaked xenops, Xenops rutilans
Chaco earthcreeper, Tarphonomus certhioides
Pale-legged hornero, Furnarius leucopus
Rufous hornero, Furnarius rufus
Crested hornero, Furnarius cristatus
Sharp-tailed streamcreeper, Lochmias nematura
Wren-like rushbird, Phleocryptes melanops
Buff-winged cinclodes, Cinclodes fuscus (V)
Sharp-billed treehunter, Heliobletus contaminatus
Black-capped foliage-gleaner, Philydor atricapillus
White-browed foliage-gleaner, Anabacerthia amaurotis (H)
Ochre-breasted foliage-gleaner, Anabacerthia lichtensteini
Buff-browed foliage-gleaner, Syndactyla rufosuperciliata
Russet-mantled foliage-gleaner, Syndactyla dimidiata
Buff-fronted foliage-gleaner, Dendroma rufa
Chestnut-capped foliage-gleaner, Clibanornis rectirostris
Canebrake groundcreeper, Clibanornis dendrocolaptoides
White-eyed foliage-gleaner, Automolus leucophthalmus
Tufted tit-spinetail, Leptasthenura platensis (V)
Rufous-fronted thornbird, Phacellodomus rufifrons
Little thornbird, Phacellodomus sibilatrix
Freckle-breasted thornbird, Phacellodomus striaticollis (H)
Greater thornbird, Phacellodomus ruber
Firewood-gatherer, Anumbius annumbi
Lark-like brushrunner, Coryphistera alaudina
Short-billed canastero, Asthenes baeri
Sharp-billed canastero, Asthenes pyrrholeuca
Rusty-backed spinetail, Cranioleuca vulpina
Stripe-crowned spinetail, Cranioleuca pyrrhophia
Olive spinetail, Cranioleuca obsoleta
Bay-capped wren-spinetail, Spartonoica maluroides
Rufous cacholote, Pseudoseisura unirufa
Brown cacholote, Pseudoseisura lophotes
Yellow-chinned spinetail, Certhiaxis cinnamomeus
Chotoy spinetail, Schoeniophylax phryganophilus
Ochre-cheeked spinetail, Synallaxis scutata
Gray-bellied spinetail, Synallaxis cinerascens
White-lored spinetail, Synallaxis albilora
Rufous-capped spinetail, Synallaxis ruficapilla
Cinereous-breasted spinetail, Synallaxis hypospodia
Spix's spinetail, Synallaxis spixi
Pale-breasted spinetail, Synallaxis albescens
Sooty-fronted spinetail, Synallaxis frontalis

Manakins
Order: PasseriformesFamily: Pipridae

The manakins are a family of subtropical and tropical mainland Central and South America, and Trinidad and Tobago. They are compact forest birds, the males typically being brightly colored, although the females of most species are duller and usually green-plumaged. Manakins feed on small fruits, berries and insects. Four species have been recorded in Paraguay.

Helmeted manakin, Antilophia galeata
Swallow-tailed manakin, Chiroxiphia caudata
White-bearded manakin, Manacus manacus
Band-tailed manakin, Pipra fasciicauda

Cotingas
Order: PasseriformesFamily: Cotingidae

The cotingas are birds of forests or forest edges in tropical South America. Comparatively little is known about this diverse group, although all have broad bills with hooked tips, rounded wings and strong legs. The males of many of the species are brightly colored, or decorated with plumes or wattles. Four species have been recorded in Paraguay.

White-tipped plantcutter, Phytotoma rutila
Swallow-tailed cotinga, Phibalura flavirostris
Red-ruffed fruitcrow, Pyroderus scutatus
Bare-throated bellbird, Procnias nudicollis

Tityras
Order: PasseriformesFamily: Tityridae

Tityridae are suboscine passerine birds found in forest and woodland in the Neotropics. The species in this family were formerly spread over the families Tyrannidae, Pipridae, and Cotingidae. They are small to medium-sized birds. They do not have the sophisticated vocal capabilities of the songbirds. Most, but not all, have plain coloring. Nine species have been recorded in Paraguay.

Black-crowned tityra, Tityra inquisitor
Black-tailed tityra, Tityra cayana
Masked tityra, Tityra semifasciata
Greenish schiffornis, Schiffornis virescens
White-naped xenopsaris, Xenopsaris albinucha
Green-backed becard, Pachyramphus viridis
Chestnut-crowned becard, Pachyramphus castaneus
White-winged becard, Pachyramphus polychopterus
Crested becard, Pachyramphus validus

Sharpbill
Order: PasseriformesFamily: Oxyruncidae

The sharpbill is a small bird of dense forests in Central and South America. It feeds mostly on fruit but also eats insects.

Sharpbill, Oxyruncus cristatus

Tyrant flycatchers
Order: PasseriformesFamily: Tyrannidae

Tyrant flycatchers are passerine birds which occur throughout North and South America. They superficially resemble the Old World flycatchers, but are more robust and have stronger bills. They do not have the sophisticated vocal capabilities of the songbirds. Most, but not all, have plain coloring. As the name implies, most are insectivorous. One hundred one species have been recorded in Paraguay.

Wing-barred piprites, Piprites chloris
White-throated spadebill, Platyrinchus mystaceus
Russet-winged spadebill, Platyrinchus leucoryphus
Southern antpipit, Corythopis delalandi
Southern bristle-tyrant, Phylloscartes eximius
Mottle-cheeked tyrannulet, Phylloscartes ventralis
São Paulo tyrannulet, Phylloscartes paulista
Bay-ringed tyrannulet, Phylloscartes sylviolus
Gray-hooded flycatcher, Mionectes rufiventris
Sepia-capped flycatcher, Leptopogon amaurocephalus
Yellow-olive flycatcher, Tolmomyias sulphurescens
Eared pygmy-tyrant, Myiornis auricularis
Drab-breasted pygmy-tyrant, Hemitriccus diops
Pearly-vented tody-tyrant, Hemitriccus margaritaceiventer
Ochre-faced tody-flycatcher, Poecilotriccus plumbeiceps
Rusty-fronted tody-flycatcher, Poecilotriccus latirostris
Common tody-flycatcher, Todirostrum cinereum
Cliff flycatcher, Hirundinea ferruginea
Greater wagtail-tyrant, Stigmatura budytoides
Plain tyrannulet, Inezia inornata
Fulvous-crowned scrub-tyrant, Euscarthmus meloryphus
Rufous-sided scrub-tyrant, Euscarthmus rufomarginatus
Southern beardless-tyrannulet, Camptostoma obsoletum
Yellow-bellied elaenia, Elaenia flavogaster
Large elaenia, Elaenia spectabilis
White-crested elaenia, Elaenia albiceps
Small-billed elaenia, Elaenia parvirostris
Olivaceous elaenia, Elaenia mesoleuca
Lesser elaenia, Elaenia chiriquensis
Small-headed elaenia, Elaenia sordida
Gray elaenia, Myiopagis caniceps
Greenish elaenia, Myiopagis viridicata
Suiriri flycatcher, Suiriri suiriri
Yellow tyrannulet, Capsiempis flaveola
Rough-legged tyrannulet, Phyllomyias burmeisteri
Greenish tyrannulet, Phyllomyias virescens
Reiser's tyrannulet, Phyllomyias reiseri
Planalto tyrannulet, Phyllomyias fasciatus
Mouse-colored tyrannulet, Phaeomyias murina
Bearded tachuri, Polystictus pectoralis
Sharp-tailed tyrant, Culicivora caudacuta
Crested doradito, Pseudocolopteryx sclateri
Subtropical doradito, Pseudocolopteryx acutipennis
Dinelli's doradito, Pseudocolopteryx dinelliana
Warbling doradito, Pseudocolopteryx flaviventris
Ticking doradito, Pseudocolopteryx citreola (V)
Sooty tyrannulet, Serpophaga nigricans
White-crested tyrannulet, Serpophaga subcristata
White-bellied tyrannulet, Serpophaga munda
Straneck's tyrannulet, Serpophaga griseicapilla
Rufous-tailed attila, Attila phoenicurus
Piratic flycatcher, Legatus leucophaius
Large-headed flatbill, Ramphotrigon megacephalum
Great kiskadee, Pitangus sulphuratus
Cattle tyrant, Machetornis rixosa
Boat-billed flycatcher, Megarynchus pitangua
Streaked flycatcher, Myiodynastes maculatus
Rusty-margined flycatcher, Myiozetetes cayanensis
Social flycatcher, Myiozetetes similis
Three-striped flycatcher, Conopias trivirgatus
Variegated flycatcher, Empidonomus varius
Crowned slaty flycatcher, Empidonomus aurantioatrocristatus
Tropical kingbird, Tyrannus melancholicus
Fork-tailed flycatcher, Tyrannus savana
Eastern kingbird, Tyrannus tyrannus
Rufous casiornis, Casiornis rufus
Sibilant sirystes, Sirystes sibilator
Swainson's flycatcher, Myiarchus swainsoni
Short-crested flycatcher, Myiarchus ferox
Brown-crested flycatcher, Myiarchus tyrannulus
Long-tailed tyrant, Colonia colonus
Bran-colored flycatcher, Myiophobus fasciatus
Southern scrub-flycatcher, Sublegatus modestus
Vermilion flycatcher, Pyrocephalus rubinus
Black-backed water-tyrant, Fluvicola albiventer
Masked water-tyrant, Fluvicola nengeta (V)
White-headed marsh tyrant, Arundinicola leucocephala
Streamer-tailed tyrant, Gubernetes yetapa
Cock-tailed tyrant, Alectrurus tricolor
Strange-tailed tyrant, Alectrurus risora
Austral negrito, Lessonia rufa
Spectacled tyrant, Hymenops perspicillatus
Crested black-tyrant, Knipolegus lophotes
Blue-billed black-tyrant, Knipolegus cyanirostris
Cinereous tyrant, Knipolegus striaticeps
White-winged black-tyrant, Knipolegus aterrimus
Hudson's black-tyrant, Knipolegus hudsoni
Yellow-browed tyrant, Satrapa icterophrys
White-rumped monjita, Xolmis velatus
White monjita, Xolmis irupero
Gray monjita, Nengetus cinereus
Black-crowned monjita, Neoxolmis coronatus
Chocolate-vented tyrant, Neoxolmis rufiventris (H)
Black-and-white monjita, Heteroxolmis dominicanus (H)
Gray-bellied shrike-tyrant, Agriornis micropterus
Lesser shrike-tyrant, Agriornis murinus
Fuscous flycatcher, Cnemotriccus fuscatus
Euler's flycatcher, Lathrotriccus euleri
Alder flycatcher, Empidonax alnorum
Tropical pewee, Contopus cinereus
Shear-tailed gray tyrant, Muscipipra vetula
Many-colored rush tyrant, Tachuris rubrigastra

Vireos
Order: PasseriformesFamily: Vireonidae

The vireos are a group of small to medium-sized passerine birds. They are typically greenish in color and resemble wood warblers apart from their heavier bills. Three species have been recorded in Paraguay.

Rufous-browed peppershrike, Cyclarhis gujanensis
Rufous-crowned greenlet, Hylophilus poicilotis
Chivi vireo, Vireo chivi

Jays
Order: PasseriformesFamily: Corvidae

The family Corvidae includes crows, ravens, jays, choughs, magpies, treepies, nutcrackers, and ground jays. Corvids are above average in size among the Passeriformes, and some of the larger species show high levels of intelligence. Three species have been recorded in Paraguay.

Purplish jay, Cyanocorax cyanomelas
Curl-crested jay, Cyanocorax cristatellus
Plush-crested jay, Cyanocorax chrysops

Swallows
Order: PasseriformesFamily: Hirundinidae

The family Hirundinidae is adapted to aerial feeding. They have a slender streamlined body, long pointed wings and a short bill with a wide gape. The feet are adapted to perching rather than walking, and the front toes are partially joined at the base. Fourteen species have been recorded in Paraguay.

Blue-and-white swallow, Pygochelidon cyanoleuca
Black-collared swallow, Pygochelidon melanoleuca (H)
Tawny-headed swallow, Alopochelidon fucata
Southern rough-winged swallow, Stelgidopteryx ruficollis
Brown-chested martin, Progne tapera
Purple martin, Progne subis
Gray-breasted martin, Progne chalybea
Southern martin, Progne elegans
White-winged swallow, Tachycineta albiventer
White-rumped swallow, Tachycineta leucorrhoa
Chilean swallow, Tachycineta leucopyga
Bank swallow, Riparia riparia
Barn swallow, Hirundo rustica
Cliff swallow, Petrochelidon pyrrhonota

Wrens
Order: PasseriformesFamily: Troglodytidae

The wrens are mainly small and inconspicuous except for their loud songs. These birds have short wings and thin down-turned bills. Several species often hold their tails upright. All are insectivorous. Five species have been recorded in Paraguay.

House wren, Troglodytes aedon
Grass wren, Cistothorus platensis
Thrush-like wren, Campylorhynchus turdinus
Buff-breasted wren, Cantorchilus leucotis
Fawn-breasted wren, Cantorchilus guarayanus

Gnatcatchers
Order: PasseriformesFamily: Polioptilidae

These dainty birds resemble Old World warblers in their build and habits, moving restlessly through the foliage seeking insects. The gnatcatchers and gnatwrens are mainly soft bluish gray in color and have the typical insectivore's long sharp bill. They are birds of fairly open woodland or scrub which nest in bushes or trees. Two species have been recorded in Paraguay.

Creamy-bellied gnatcatcher, Polioptila lactea
Masked gnatcatcher, Polioptila dumicola

Donacobius
Order: PasseriformesFamily: Donacobiidae

The black-capped donacobius is found in wet habitats from Panama across northern South America and east of the Andes to Argentina and Paraguay.

Black-capped donacobius, Donacobius atricapilla

Thrushes
Order: PasseriformesFamily: Turdidae

The thrushes are a group of passerine birds that occur mainly in the Old World. They are plump, soft plumaged, small to medium-sized insectivores or sometimes omnivores, often feeding on the ground. Many have attractive songs. Seven species have been recorded in Paraguay.

Veery, Catharus fuscescens (V)
Yellow-legged thrush, Turdus flavipes (extirpated)
Pale-breasted thrush, Turdus leucomelas
Rufous-bellied thrush, Turdus rufiventris
Creamy-bellied thrush, Turdus amaurochalinus
Blacksmith thrush, Turdus subalaris
White-necked thrush, Turdus albicollis

Mockingbirds
Order: PasseriformesFamily: Mimidae

The mimids are a family of passerine birds that includes thrashers, mockingbirds, tremblers, and the New World catbirds. These birds are notable for their vocalizations, especially their ability to mimic a wide variety of birds and other sounds heard outdoors. Their coloring tends towards dull-grays and browns. Two species have been recorded in Paraguay.

Chalk-browed mockingbird, Mimus saturninus
White-banded mockingbird, Mimus triurus

Old World sparrows
Order: PasseriformesFamily: Passeridae

Sparrows are small passerine birds. In general, sparrows tend to be small, plump, brown or gray birds with short tails and short powerful beaks. Sparrows are seed eaters, but they also consume small insects. One species has been recorded in Paraguay.

House sparrow, Passer domesticus (I)

Pipits and wagtails
Order: PasseriformesFamily: Motacillidae

Motacillidae is a family of small passerine birds with medium to long tails. They include the wagtails, longclaws and pipits. They are slender, ground feeding insectivores of open country. Six species have been recorded in Paraguay.

Yellowish pipit, Anthus chii
Short-billed pipit, Anthus furcatus
Pampas pipit, Anthus chacoensis (V)
Correndera pipit, Anthus correndera (V)
Ochre-breasted pipit, Anthus nattereri
Hellmayr's pipit, Anthus hellmayri

Finches
Order: PasseriformesFamily: Fringillidae

Finches are seed-eating passerine birds, that are small to moderately large and have a strong beak, usually conical and in some species very large. All have twelve tail feathers and nine primaries. These birds have a bouncing flight with alternating bouts of flapping and gliding on closed wings, and most sing well. Seven species have been recorded in Paraguay.

Hooded siskin, Spinus magellanica
Golden-rumped euphonia, Chlorophonia cyanocephala
Blue-naped chlorophonia, Chlorophonia cyanea
Purple-throated euphonia, Euphonia chlorotica
Green-throated euphonia, Euphonia chalybea
Violaceous euphonia, Euphonia violacea
Chestnut-bellied euphonia, Euphonia pectoralis

Sparrows
Order: PasseriformesFamily: Passerellidae

Most of the species are known as sparrows, but these birds are not closely related to the Old World sparrows which are in the family Passeridae. Many of these have distinctive head patterns. Four species have been recorded in Paraguay.

Chaco sparrow, Rhynchospiza strigiceps
Grassland sparrow, Ammodramus humeralis
Saffron-billed sparrow, Arremon flavirostris
Rufous-collared sparrow, Zonotrichia capensis

Blackbirds
Order: PasseriformesFamily: Icteridae

The icterids are a group of small to medium-sized, often colorful, passerine birds restricted to the New World and include the grackles, New World blackbirds, and New World orioles. Most species have black as the predominant plumage color, often enlivened by yellow, orange, or red. Twenty species have been recorded in Paraguay.

Bobolink, Dolichonyx oryzivorus
White-browed meadowlark, Leistes superciliaris
Crested oropendola, Psarocolius decumanus
Solitary black cacique, Cacicus solitarius
Golden-winged cacique, Cacicus chrysopterus
Red-rumped cacique, Cacicus haemorrhous
Orange-backed troupial, Icterus croconotus
Variable oriole, Icterus pyrrhopterus
Screaming cowbird, Molothrus rufoaxillaris
Giant cowbird, Molothrus oryzivorus
Shiny cowbird, Molothrus bonariensis
Scarlet-headed blackbird, Amblyramphus holosericeus
Chopi blackbird, Gnorimopsar chopi
Grayish baywing, Agelaioides badius
Unicolored blackbird, Agelasticus cyanopus
Yellow-winged blackbird, Agelasticus thilius (V)
Chestnut-capped blackbird, Chrysomus ruficapillus
Saffron-cowled blackbird, Xanthopsar flavus
Yellow-rumped marshbird, Pseudoleistes guirahuro
Brown-and-yellow marshbird, Pseudoleistes virescens (V)

Wood-warblers
Order: PasseriformesFamily: Parulidae

The wood-warblers are a group of small, often colorful, passerine birds restricted to the New World. Most are arboreal, but some are terrestrial. Most members of this family are insectivores. Six species have been recorded in Paraguay.

Masked yellowthroat, Geothlypis aequinoctialis
Tropical parula, Parula pitiayumi
Flavescent warbler, Myiothlypis flaveola
White-browed warbler, Myiothlypis leucoblephara
Riverbank warbler, Myiothlypis rivularis
Golden-crowned warbler, Basileuterus culicivorus

Cardinal grosbeaks
Order: PasseriformesFamily: Cardinalidae

The cardinals are a family of robust, seed-eating birds with strong bills. They are typically associated with open woodland. The sexes usually have distinct plumages. Six species have been recorded in Paraguay.

Hepatic tanager, Piranga flava
Red-crowned ant-tanager, Habia rubica
Black-backed grosbeak, Pheucticus aureoventris
Blackish-blue seedeater, Amaurospiza moesta
Glaucous-blue grosbeak, Cyanoloxia glaucocaerulea
Ultramarine grosbeak, Cyanoloxia brissonii

Tanagers
Order: PasseriformesFamily: Thraupidae

The tanagers are a large group of small to medium-sized passerine birds restricted to the New World, mainly in the tropics. Many species are brightly colored. As a family they are omnivorous, but individual species specialize in eating fruits, seeds, insects, or other types of food. Most have short, rounded wings. Seventy species have been recorded in Paraguay.

Hooded tanager, Nemosia pileata
Guira tanager, Hemithraupis guira
Chestnut-vented conebill, Conirostrum speciosum
Saffron finch, Sicalis flaveola
Grassland yellow-finch, Sicalis luteola
Uniform finch, Haplospiza unicolor
Blue-black grassquit, Volatinia jacarina
Ruby-crowned tanager, Tachyphonus coronatus
White-lined tanager, Tachyphonus rufus
Gray-headed tanager, Eucometis penicillata
Black-goggled tanager, Trichothraupis melanops
Red-crested finch, Coryphospingus cucullatus
Silver-beaked tanager, Ramphocelus carbo
Swallow tanager, Tersina viridis
Blue dacnis, Dacnis cayana
Lined seedeater, Sporophila lineola
White-bellied seedeater, Sporophila leucoptera
Copper seedeater, Sporophila bouvreuil
Pearly-bellied seedeater, Sporophila pileata
Tawny-bellied seedeater, Sporophila hypoxantha
Dark-throated seedeater, Sporophila ruficollis
Marsh seedeater, Sporophila palustris
Rufous-rumped seedeater, Sporophila hypochroma
Chestnut seedeater, Sporophila cinnamomea
Chestnut-bellied seed-finch, Sporophila angolensis
Yellow-bellied seedeater, Sporophila nigricollis (H)
Double-collared seedeater, Sporophila caerulescens
Temminck's seedeater, Sporophila falcirostris
Buffy-fronted seedeater, Sporophila frontalis (H)
Plumbeous seedeater, Sporophila plumbea
Rusty-collared seedeater, Sporophila collaris
Many-colored chaco finch, Saltatricula multicolor
Black-throated saltator, Saltatricula atricollis
Bluish-gray saltator, Saltator coerulescens
Green-winged saltator, Saltator similis
Golden-billed saltator, Saltator aurantiirostris
Black-throated grosbeak, Saltator fuliginosus
Black-masked finch, Coryphaspiza melanotis
Great Pampa-finch, Embernagra platensis
Wedge-tailed grass-finch, Emberizoides herbicola
Lesser grass-finch, Emberizoides ypiranganus
Black-and-rufous warbling finch, Poospiza nigrorufa
Orange-headed tanager, Thlypopsis sordida
Chestnut-headed tanager, Thlypopsis pyrrhocoma
Gray-throated warbling finch, Microspingus cabanisi (V)
Ringed warbling-finch, Microspingus torquatus
Black-capped warbling finch, Microspingus melanoleucus
White-rumped tanager, Cypsnagra hirundinacea
Long-tailed reed finch, Donacospiza albifrons
Bananaquit, Coereba flaveola
Dull-colored grassquit, Asemospiza obscura
Sooty grassquit, Asemospiza fuliginosa
Black-crested finch, Lophospingus pusillus
White-banded tanager, Neothraupis fasciata
Diuca finch, Diuca diuca (H)
Yellow cardinal, Gubernatrix cristata (H)
Red-crested cardinal, Paroaria coronata
Yellow-billed cardinal, Paroaria capitata
Diademed tanager, Stephanophorus diadematus (V)
Black-faced tanager, Schistochlamys melanopis (V)
Cinnamon tanager, Schistochlamys ruficapillus (V)
Magpie tanager, Cissopis leverianus
Fawn-breasted tanager, Pipraeidea melanonota
Blue-and-yellow tanager, Rauenia bonariensis
Chestnut-backed tanager, Stilpnia preciosa (V)
Burnished-buff tanager, Stilpnia cayana
Green-headed tanager, Tangara seledon
Red-necked tanager, Tangara cyanocephala (H)
Sayaca tanager, Thraupis sayaca
Palm tanager, Thraupis palmarum

Notes

References

See also
List of birds
Lists of birds by region

External links
Birds of Paraguay - World Institute for Conservation and Environment

Paraguay
 
Birds
Paraguay